Charles Henry Robinson (July 27, 1856 – May 18, 1913) was an American Major League Baseball catcher during the 1884 and 1885 seasons.

Born in the Rhode Island beachfront town of Westerly, Robinson died in Providence at the age of 56.

External links
Baseball-Reference page

1856 births
1913 deaths
19th-century baseball players
Baseball players from Rhode Island
Major League Baseball catchers
Indianapolis Hoosiers (AA) players
Brooklyn Grays players
People from Westerly, Rhode Island
Bay City (minor league baseball) players
Oswego Starchboxes players
Brockton (minor league baseball) players
Providence Grays (minor league) players